Heathrow Terminal 1 is a disused airport terminal at London Heathrow Airport that was in operation between 1968 and 2015.  When it was officially opened by Queen Elizabeth II in April 1969 it was the largest new airport terminal in western Europe.  Prior to its closure on 29 June 2015 it had only been handling twenty daily flights by British Airways to nine destinations. In May 2017 the contents of the terminal were put up for auction. The footprint of Terminal 1 was planned to be used for construction of the second phase of Heathrow Terminal 2.

History

Terminal 1 was designed by Frederick Gibberd, who also designed the earlier Europa Building (renamed Terminal 2) and the adjacent Queens Building. It opened to passengers in 1968, and it was formally opened by Queen Elizabeth II in April 1969. At the time, Terminal 1 was the biggest short-haul terminal of its kind in Western Europe.

A new pier (the so-called Europier) was added in the 1990s which increased the capacity of the terminal, catering for wide-body aircraft. There was separation between arriving and departing passengers within the International section, although the terminal was not originally built to cater for this separation. In 2005, a substantial redesign and redevelopment of Terminal 1 was completed, which saw the opening of the new Eastern Extension, doubling the departure lounge in size and creating additional seating and retail space.

Since the buyout of British Midland International (BMI), British Airways served some short- and medium-haul destinations from this terminal. Virgin Atlantic operated its short lived Little Red UK domestic operation from the former BMI departure area in Gate 8 of Terminal 1.

Terminal 1 closed on 29 June 2015 to allow the second stage of Terminal 2's expansion. Ahead of its closure, all remaining flights were moved to other terminals. Several airlines had already left Terminal 1 ahead of this date during 2014 and 2015. The last tenants alongside British Airways were Icelandair, El Al and TAM Airlines; TAM Airlines moved to Terminal 3 on 27 May 2015.

During Terminal 1's final days, British Airways was the last airline to operate there, with flights to Amman-Queen Alia, Baku, Beirut, Cairo and Hannover, which all moved to Terminal 5, and to Bilbao, Luxembourg, Lyon and Marseille, which have been relocated to Terminal 3.

The final flight to depart Terminal 1 was British Airways BA0970 to Hannover, Germany, which departed at 21:30 on 29 June 2015. 

As of 2019, the main terminal building still stands, empty but untouched, although some of the ancillary structures and contact piers have been demolished.

Facilities
Due to its impending closure, there were just seven shops left airside in the terminal by June 2015: Boots, Cocoon, Dixons Travel, Glorious Britain, WHSmith and World Duty Free. There was an airside link to Terminal 2 allowing passengers to use the facilities in that terminal. All Star Alliance members formerly in Terminal 1 moved to Terminal 2 due to its closure. The Star Alliance lounge, the El Al King David Lounge and the Servisair lounge were closed prior to the closure of the terminal. The British Airways International lounge near Gate 5 was operational until the end. The gates at Terminal 1 were numbered 2–8, 16–21 and 74–78. In early 2017 it was announced that the global auction firm CA Global Partners would host a series of auctions and private treaty sales involving all of the remaining contents of the terminal.

Ground transport

Road links
As part of the three central terminals at Heathrow, it was well linked to the M4 motorway via the M4 spur road and through a tunnel under the north runway. There was a short stay car park directly opposite the terminal and there was also a long stay car park on the Northern Perimeter Road by the northern entrance to the tunnel accessed by a shuttle bus service.

Rail links
Terminal 1 was accessed by the London Underground from Heathrow Terminals 1, 2, 3 tube station, with trains towards Cockfosters via Central London. The terminal was also accessed by Heathrow Connect and Heathrow Express from Heathrow Central railway station, where services operate to other Heathrow terminals and to London Paddington.

Bus links
Terminal 1 was accessible to both bus and coach services from Heathrow Central bus station. There were also several coach services operated by National Express.

References

External links

Heathrow Airport website

1 London Heathrow Terminal 1
Heathrow Airport Holdings
Airport terminals
Terminal 1
Terminal 1
Transport infrastructure completed in 1969
1969 establishments in England